Veera Chozhan   is a river flowing in the Nagapattinam district of the Indian state of Tamil Nadu.

See also 
 List of rivers of Tamil Nadu

References 

Rivers of Tamil Nadu
Nagapattinam district
Rivers of India